Kristin Hedstrom (born May 14, 1986 in Boston, Massachusetts) is an American rower. Growing up in Concord, Massachusetts, she attended Concord-Carlisle High School until her graduation in 2004. She then attended the University of Wisconsin, where she graduated in 2008 with a degree in Business Management. She currently resides in Oakland, California where she was affiliated with the California Rowing Club. She is now a personal trainer who works one-on-one with rowers around the country.

Rowing career
Hedstrom began rowing during her first year of high school on a club team called Community Rowing, Inc. She continued her rowing career at the University of Wisconsin, where she was a member of the lightweight eight that won gold in the 2006 and 2008 Intercollegiate Rowing Association Championship as well as gold in the 2006, 2007, and 2008 Eastern Sprints. She is a six-time USRowing national team member (2007–08, Under 23; 2009–12, Senior). After college, Hedstrom won gold in the lightweight double sculls and lightweight quadruple sculls at the 2009 USRowing National Championships, won the lightweight single sculls at the 2009 Head of the Charles Regatta, and won gold in the lightweight single sculls and lightweight double sculls at the 2010 USRowing National Championships. She competed in the lightweight double sculls at the 2012 Summer Olympics with team-mate Julie Nichols.

References

External links
 
 www.kristinhedstrom.com
 Kristin Hedstrom's website
 Kristin Hedstrom's Rowing Workouts

1986 births
Living people
People from Concord, Massachusetts
Sportspeople from Middlesex County, Massachusetts
Rowers at the 2012 Summer Olympics
Olympic rowers of the United States
American female rowers
World Rowing Championships medalists for the United States
Concord-Carlisle High School alumni
Wisconsin School of Business alumni
21st-century American women